Water toad is a name used for several species of toads:

 Helmeted water toad (Calyptocephalella gayi)
 Korean water toad (Bufo stejnegeri)
 Surinam water toads (Pipa spp.)

Animal common name disambiguation pages